John Ngugi Kamau (born 10 May 1962), is a former Kenyan long-distance runner, often called one of the greatest cross country runners of all time and winner of the 5000 metres at the 1988 Summer Olympics, in Seoul South Korea.

Career
Born in Kigumo, Muranga District, John Ngugi's earliest international successes came at the World Cross Country Championships, where he won a record four consecutive titles between 1986 and 1989 and five titles overall.

Ngugi established himself as a track runner when he won his heat of the 5000 m at the 1987 World Championships in Rome. In the final, Ngugi took the lead during the second kilometre, but despite his front-running tactics, he was outsprinted in the finish, finishing in a disappointing twelfth place. He won 5000 metres race in the 1987 All-Africa Games held in Kenya.

At the Seoul Olympic Games, Ngugi took the lead after the kilometre and achieved a 50 m lead. Although his lead was reduced when the expected sprints came in the last lap, Ngugi still won by 30 metres.

At the 1990 Commonwealth Games in Auckland, New Zealand, Ngugi tried exactly the same tactics which had won him the Olympic gold medal. Although he tripped and fell after only two laps and lost 35 m on the rest of the field, he caught the leading group and establish a gap of 40 m at the bell. But in this time, that wasn't enough, as Andrew Lloyd from Australia won by a mere 0.08 seconds in an incredible finishing burst.

Ngugi returned in 1992 to capture the World Cross Country title for the fifth time. That was his final appearance at a major international championship before his retirement.

In 1993 Ngugi refused to take an out-of-competition drug test, and he then received a four-year suspension for the infraction. He contested the ruling, spending $80,000 of his own money to fight his case in Monaco. His ban was later reduced as it was judged that the Kenya Athletics Federation had not followed its duty of educating its athletes about out-of-competition testing and that Ngugi had a limited education. However, the long battle to contest the decision brought an end to his running career as his physical fitness had heavily declined over the period.

References

External links
Legends of the cross

1962 births
Living people
People from Murang'a County
Kenyan male long-distance runners
Olympic athletes of Kenya
Olympic gold medalists for Kenya
Athletes (track and field) at the 1988 Summer Olympics
Medalists at the 1988 Summer Olympics
Commonwealth Games medallists in athletics
Commonwealth Games silver medallists for Kenya
Athletes (track and field) at the 1990 Commonwealth Games
World Athletics Championships athletes for Kenya
World Athletics Cross Country Championships winners
Doping cases in athletics
Kenyan sportspeople in doping cases
Olympic gold medalists in athletics (track and field)
African Games gold medalists for Kenya
African Games medalists in athletics (track and field)
Kenyan male cross country runners
Goodwill Games medalists in athletics
Athletes (track and field) at the 1987 All-Africa Games
Competitors at the 1990 Goodwill Games
Medallists at the 1990 Commonwealth Games